Enna Ben Abidi is a Paralympian athlete from Tunisia competing mainly in category F40 throwing events.

Enna won a complete set of medals in the 2004 Summer Paralympics in Athens, where she won the gold medal in the F40 discus, the silver in the F40 javelin and completed the set with a bronze in the F40 shot put.

External links
 Abidi&fname=Enna&gender=all profile on paralympic.org

Paralympic athletes of Tunisia
Athletes (track and field) at the 2004 Summer Paralympics
Paralympic gold medalists for Tunisia
Paralympic silver medalists for Tunisia
Paralympic bronze medalists for Tunisia
Living people
Medalists at the 2004 Summer Paralympics
Tunisian female javelin throwers
Tunisian female shot putters
Year of birth missing (living people)
Paralympic medalists in athletics (track and field)
20th-century Tunisian women
21st-century Tunisian women